Richmond Community High School (RCHS) is an alternative high school operated by the Richmond City Public Schools in Richmond, Virginia, United States. It was founded in 1977 as America's first full-time, four year, public high school for academically talented students primarily from minority and low-income families.

Richmond Community High School admits applicants from within the city limits who are identified as academically gifted, with a preference for socio-economically challenged students. Virtually all graduates continue to college.

History 
For the first two years (1977–1979) the school was housed inside the Richmond Mosque, better known as a live music venue. From 1979–1986, it operated in extra space in an elementary school (Carver) within the school district. From 1986–1990, RCHS had a home in the Maggie Walker building, which had previously been a neighborhood high school. In 1990, RCHS moved into the former Westhampton Elementary School building, located on what was a large wooded site at 5800 Patterson Avenue (State Route 6) in  The West End of Richmond.

After years of moving from location to location, RCHS is now located at 201 E. Brookland Park Ave.

In the early years, the school only accepted students every other year. The first class graduated in 1981; since 1987, the school has graduated a class every year.

Grant

The school began with a grant from Richmond businessman-philanthropist Andrew J. Asch, Jr., perhaps best known as the 1970s developer of downtown Richmond's Shockoe Slip area, a collection of tobacco warehouses in which are located shops, restaurants and offices.

Asch's original grant was made to the Virginia State University Foundation, which assisted Richmond Public Schools with a demonstration program. (For the first several months of existence, the project was known within the
city schools system as merely the "Secondary School Experiential Learning Community".)

Asch thought bright students from minority and low-income families should have the cultural and educational opportunities his own children had enjoyed. He remained active in the affairs of the school until his death in 1991.

References

External links

Alternative schools in the United States
High schools in Richmond, Virginia
Public high schools in Virginia
Educational institutions established in 1977
1977 establishments in Virginia